, also known as Innocence Moratorium, is the debut studio album by Japanese singer and songwriter Ringo Sheena, released on February 24, 1999, by Toshiba EMI. The album debuted at #2 and has sold over 1,433,000 copies. The album was certified triple platinum by the RIAJ for 1,200,000 copies shipped. The album was named number 3 on Bounces 2009 list of 54 Standard Japanese Rock Albums.

Background 
Ringo Sheena composed nearly all the songs on this album in her teenage years, prior to her major label debut.  The album combines multiple genres of music from both the East and the West, including J-Pop and grunge.
Both the album and song titles combine Kanji and English, and the lyrics are written using English and Historical kana usage.

The songs "When It Begins to Get Dark...," "Caution," "A View of Happiness (Joy Ver.)" and "Queen of Kabuki-cho" were used in TV commercials for Suntory's The Cocktail Bar range of drinks.

Track listing

Credits and personnel 
Sheena used different bands throughout the album. She was also joined by guests Neko Saito (who continues working with her) and Chieko Kinbara (who works with Björk).

 (#1,2,4,6,8,10)
 Ringo Sheena - vocals, drums (#2), handclap, whistle
 Susumu Nishikawa - electric guitar, acoustic guitar
 Seiji Kameda - bass guitar, handclap
 Noriyasu Kawamura - drums, backing vocal, handclap

 (#3)
 Ringo Sheena - vocals, acoustic piano, melodica, handclap, footsteps
 Seiji Kameda - bass guitar, backing vocal
 Noriyasu Kawamura - drums, backing vocal, handclap, footsteps

 (#5,7,9,11)
 Ringo Sheena - vocal, fake koto (Synthesizer), whistle
 Akihito Suzuki - electric guitar, acoustic guitar, backing vocal guidance
 Seiji Kameda - bass guitar
 Noriyasu Kawamura - drums, conga

Guest Players
 Toshiyuki Mori - electronic organ (#1,10), acoustic piano (#5)
 Neko Saito - acoustic violin (#9)
 Chieko Kinbara Strings - string section (#1,5)
 Tsunehiko Yashiro - electric organ (#8)

Notes 

Ringo Sheena albums
1999 albums
Albums produced by Seiji Kameda